The 2020 J1 League, also known as the  for sponsorship reasons, was the 28th season of the J1 League, the top Japanese professional league for association football clubs, since its establishment in 1993. The league began on 21 February and eventually ended on 19 December 2020. The league was planned to have a season break to avoid clashing with the 2020 Summer Olympics, but the Olympics were postponed due to the COVID-19 pandemic in Japan.

Yokohama F. Marinos were the defending champions while Kashiwa Reysol and Yokohama FC entered the league as promoted teams from the 2019 J2 League, replacing Júbilo Iwata and Matsumoto Yamaga who were relegated to the 2020 J2 League.

Effects of the COVID-19 pandemic
On 25 February, all J.League matches until 15 March were postponed in response to the COVID-19 pandemic in Japan. After that, it was announced that it would be postponed until 29 March. On 19 March, the J.League announced no relegation would take place for the 2020 season, with the J1 League expanding to 20 clubs for the 2021 season. On 25 March, the league announced that it would be suspended 3 April to 6 May.

On 3 April, the Japan Professional Football League decided to resume the league, gradually resumed J3 from 25 April, J2 from 2 May, and J1 from 9 May. However the league was postponed again.

On 29 May, the JPFL decided to resume the season on 27 June. The season is projected to resume on 4 July. On 9 June, the JPFL announced the new schedule of the 2020 season. On 15 June, it was announced that the first 2 matches in each league (J1, J2, and J3) would be held without spectators.  After 10 July, as a general rule, the maximum number of people allowed is 5,000. The stadiums with less than 10,000 capacity would have up to 50% of the capacity. Away supporters are not allowed. After August, the maximum stadium capacity was 50%, and there would be "high alert spectator matches".

After the 11th J.League extraordinary executive committee meeting on 20 July, it was announced that the "super strict alert audience game" extended to 10 August in view of the spread of coronavirus infection.

Clubs

For the 2020 season, there were only two changes in the league. Kashiwa Reysol returned as the 2019 J2 League champions and Yokohama FC as runners-up after 13 seasons absence from the top tier of Japanese football. They replaced Matsumoto Yamaga (one season in J1) and Júbilo Iwata (four seasons in J1), who were relegated to the 2020 J2 League.

Meanwhile, Shonan Bellmare remained in the J1 League after defeating Tokushima Vortis in the 2019 J2 League play-off final.

Personnel and kits

Managerial changes

Foreign players
As of 2020 season, there are no more restrictions on a number of signed foreign players, but clubs can only register up to five foreign players for a single match-day squad. Players from J.League partner nations (Thailand, Vietnam, Myanmar, Malaysia, Cambodia, Singapore, Indonesia and Qatar) are exempt from these restrictions.

Players name in bold indicates the player is registered during the mid-season transfer window.
Player's name in italics indicates the player has Japanese nationality in addition to their FIFA nationality, or is exempt from being treated as a foreign player due to having been born in Japan and being enrolled in, or having graduated from school in the country.

League table
It was decided on 19 March to change the format regarding the rules for promotion/relegation for the end of the season for the J1, J2 and J3 leagues, such that there would be no relegation this season, that two clubs from the J2 League would be promoted to the 2021 J1 League, and that two clubs from the J3 League would be promoted to the 2021 J2 League (subject to licensing regulations).

Results table

Season statistics

Top scorers

Hat-tricks

 4 Player scored 4 goals

Attendances

References

External links
 Official website, JLeague.jp 

J1 League seasons
Japan
J1